The Bolivian football league system is a series of interconnected leagues for association football clubs in Bolivia.

Overview
At the top is the División de Fútbol Profesional Boliviano (first division) with 14 clubs. Below the 1st level is the Copa Simón Bolívar (second division). In order to qualify for the Copa Simón Bolívar there are 9 subdivisions at the 3rd level: the Departmental Championships or Regional Leagues, which comprises teams from the different Departments of Bolivia: Santa Cruz, La Paz, Cochabamba, Chuquisaca, Oruro, Tarija Department, Beni Department, Pando Department and Potosí.

Current system

References

 
Bol